Männin is a 2015 French-German philosophical drama film (short film) written and directed by Mika'ela Fisher.

Plot
What does being a man? What does being a woman?  A search for identity that unites these two sexes to the same person.

Background
Männin is a term originated by Martin Luther, meaning woman created from the rib of man.( Verse Gen 2:23 ).

And the man said, "This at last is bone of my bone and flesh of my flesh. One will call her she- man (Männin), based on this that she was taken out of the man". Lutherbibel

About the film
Männin is a psychological interrogation. Man and woman deal with the identity rules of society and try to become aware of their role. In doing so, they resort to their biblical ancestors , the first human pair and ancestral parents of all humans, Adam and  Eve.

The dialogues of the film are alternately in  German and French, and are intended to support the idea of duality.

Note
 Both Adam and Eve are portrayed by the same person to reveal the duality and yet sameness of us all.
 The film ends with a thesis of Franz Kafka. Oktavheft G ( II, 2 )

"We were expelled from paradise and therefore it remained intact. This expulsion is in a way a form of good luck, because had we not been expelled from paradise, paradise would have had to be destroyed.” (Franz Kafka)

Reception 
American Psychological Association Film Festival 2015  
 Accolade Global Film Competition 2015  
 Religion Today Film Festival 2015  
 Great Lakes International Film Festival 2015

Accolades

Release
The film started a theatrical run on January 7, 2015 at Cinema Saint André des Arts in Paris, and was shown again at the Arthouse 
Cinema Studio Galande from December 16, 2015 to January 2016.
The film is listed in the catalog of Bibliothèque nationale de France, Mediapart.

References

External links 
 
 Filmstarts Männin
 Unifrance Männin
 Allocine Männin
 Homepage Männin

2015 films
French drama short films
German drama short films
Films directed by Mika'ela Fisher
2010s French-language films
2010s German-language films
2015 drama films
2010s avant-garde and experimental films
French avant-garde and experimental films
German avant-garde and experimental films
2015 multilingual films
2015 short films
French multilingual films
German multilingual films
2010s French films
2010s German films